Elroy Josephs (23 February 1939 – 8 February 1997) was a Jamaican actor and dancer who became the first black dance teacher at a British University. His style of dance fused African-Caribbean with those of Europe and Asia.

Dancing 

Coming to England as a youth in 1950, Josephs began his career as a professional dancer with Les Ballets Nègres. He studied many forms of dances with various renowned teachers in the field: Indian with Ram Gopal, Spanish with Elsa Brunelleschi and Caribbean and African with Ben Johnson and Obie Shelankey. He set up a company during the sixties called Elroy Josephz Productions, which performed in cabarets in Madrid.

Acting 

Along the way, Josephs made a career, performing on stage and having an acting career on television. He was one of the first black dancers to appear in West Side Story in the West End. On TV, he featured in ITV Play of the Week, Sunday Night Theatre, Dixon of Dock Green, Doctor Who (Season 4 premiere The Smugglers), Adam Adamant Lives!, The Wednesday Play, Theatre 625, Love Thy Neighbour, Stage 2 and Brideshead Revisited. On film, he was credited in The Alf Garnett Saga but went uncredited in Hammer Film Productions of Quatermass and the Pit.

In the early 1970s, Josephs started a community dance project in Camden called Workshop No. 7 and was appointed as one of the Greater London Arts Association's (GLAA) First dance animateurs.

Central to the dancer's work was his understanding of the historical importance of transatlantic slavery and its legacies. During 1973-75, he was Chairman of the Dance Committee and dance specialist for the British zone of the Second World Black and African Festival of Arts and culture in Lagos. Afterwards, he worked with the Commission for Racial Equality and Equity, supporting artists and students who were confronted by discrimination.

In 1979, Josephs left his dance project in the hands of Carl Campbell (who developed it into Dance Company 7) when he was appointed dance lecturer at I.M. Teacher Training College in Liverpool. In 1993, he chaired an event in Manchester called "What is Black Dance in Britain?"

Elroy was an inspiration and influence to the students he taught in London and Liverpool. Since his death, his legacy has lived on through former colleagues and students.

Tributes 

In November 1997, a bench and plaque was unveiled in Elroy's memory at John Moores University. As part of Black History Month in October 2012, the International Slavery Museum and Enterprise South Liverpool Academy staged a tribute show in the lecturer's memory, to spotlight his often overlooked influence on black dance culture. Over 2013-2014, the Slavery museum held an exhibition called British Dance: Black Routes which featured Josephs' relatively untold story and a display dedicated to the dancer.

Notes

References

External links

Elroy Josephs at Theatricalia
Elroy Josephz - A Tribute on YouTube

1939 births
1997 deaths
Jamaican male actors
Migrants from British Jamaica to the United Kingdom